Andrei Lebedev may refer to:
 Andrei Vladimirovich Lebedev (b. 1963), Soviet and Russian footballer
 Andrey Lebedzew (b. 1991), Belarusian footballer